University of Birmingham School is a mixed free school that occupies a new, purpose-built building located on the University of Birmingham's Selly Oak campus. The University of Birmingham School opened in September 2015, and is sponsored by the University of Birmingham and managed by an Academy Trust.

The university obtained twenty million pounds for the school's building, but later supplemented this with three million pounds of its own money to pay for expanded features such as wider corridors and very large classrooms. The curriculum includes a commitment to teaching virtue and empathy as part of curricular as well as extra-curricular activities.

In 2016, the school had 1768 applications for 150 places, and was considering expanding its intake.

Principals 

So far the University of Birmingham School has had two principals. The current principal is Colin Townsend who joined in September 2018 after serving as headteacher of Denbigh High School, Luton. The previous principal was Michael Roden who was appointed in 2013 before the school's opening. He was previously headteacher of the King Edward VI Camp Hill School for Boys

References

External links
 University of Birmingham School homepage

Secondary schools in Birmingham, West Midlands
School
Educational institutions established in 2015
2015 establishments in England
Free schools in England